In computing, Maak is a utility similar to make, designed to build complex software systems while avoiding the need to recompile the entire system every time a change is made. "Maak" is Dutch for "make".

See also
Nix package manager

References

External links

Subversion repository

Build automation
Compiling tools